The following is a list of episodes 1–27 of the anime series Rurouni Kenshin. Directed by Kazuhiro Furuhashi and produced by Aniplex and Fuji TV, the series premiered in Japan on Fuji TV on January 10, 1996, and ran through October 16, 1996. These episodes are based on the first six volumes of the manga series of the same name by Nobuhiro Watsuki. Situated during the early Meiji period in Japan, the story tells of a fictional assassin named Kenshin Himura, who becomes a wanderer to protect the people of Japan.

The series was licensed for broadcast and home video release in North America by Media Blasters, who split it up into "seasons". They refer to their English dub of the first 27 episodes as season one. These were aired on Cartoon Network's Toonami programming block from March 17, 2003, through April 22, 2003. Media Blasters released this season within six DVDs of the anime, each containing four episodes, from July 25, 2000, to May 1, 2001. A DVD compilation of season 1 was released on November 15, 2005.

These first 27 episodes use three pieces of theme music, one opening and two endings. The opening theme is "Sobakasu" by Judy and Mary. "Tactics" by The Yellow Monkey is used as the ending theme for the first fourteen episodes. At episode 15, the song changes to "Namida wa Shitte Iru" by Mayo Suzukaze, who also provides the voice for the titular character Kenshin Himura.


Episode list
The titles on top are those from the Media Blasters version. The titles on the bottom are of the Samurai X Sony episodes posted on Crackle.

References
General
 

Specific

1996 Japanese television seasons
Season 1